The Miami Strangler is the name attributed to an unidentified serial killer who murdered at least nine women in Miami, Florida, between 1964 and 1970.

Murders 
On August 17, 1964, Mary E. McGreevy, 64, was smothered to death in her home with a pillow.

Six months later, on March 8, 1965, 38-year-old Sylvia Valdez left her workplace at about 9:00 p.m. She walked to the parking lot where her car was parked, and discovered it had a flat tire. At 10:30 p.m., a parking lot attendant changed Valdez's tire and saw her speaking with two Cuban men as he walked away. Valdez was found dead in her car the next morning. A black silk scarf was wrapped around her neck, and her skirt was pulled over her head. She was also shot behind the right ear twice with a .22 caliber pistol. Although her purse, shoes, and car keys were stolen, the perpetrator didn't take other valuable items from her, such as her diamond ring. It was also determined that Valdez had not been sexually assaulted.

In February of 1966, 44-year-old Bernadita Gonzalez was last seen alive in a Miami beauty salon. Eight weeks later, her decomposing body was discovered floating face down in Levitz Lake by a highway patrolman. The medical examiner determined that she died from blunt-force trauma to the skull, which may have been inflicted by a hatchet. The perpetrator took her underwear, but left her jewelry on her.

Sherivon Dolores Wooten, a 21-year-old black woman, was the next victim. On August 16, 1969, her dead body was found on a dirt road between two homes. Like the previous victims, she was strangled to death, and her clothes were hiked over her breasts. There were also fingernail marks on her neck. Wooten was last seen leaving her house the night before her body was found.

On May 5, 1970, 64-year-old Mary Louise Clark Danford was found strangled to death in her home by worried friends – who came to check on Danford after she stopped answering their phone calls. Danford was found on her bed with her sweater pushed up and her underwear missing. She was last seen buying groceries a few hours before her body was discovered. The perpetrator gained entry into the home through a small window.

The next victim was 64-year-old Ruth Boehner, whose body was discovered in her apartment on June 2, 1970. Her cause of death was blunt-force trauma to the head, neck, and jaw. Additionally, Boehner had been strangled, which caused her hyoid bone to break. Her nightgown was also pulled up, and her clothes were disheveled. There was no evidence of forced entry into the apartment.

On August 5, 1970, 84-year-old Mattie Ophelia Harris was strangled to death with a necktie in her kitchen. Her nightgown had also been pulled up, and her house was ransacked.

On October 10, 1970, Regina Bonnanno, a 48-year-old deaf-mute woman, was found dead in her apartment. She was bound to her bed, and her bra and a scarf were tied around her neck. Panties had also been stuffed in her mouth, and her head was shoved inside of a pillowcase.

The final confirmed victim of the Miami Strangler was 36-year-old Patrice Finer Newkirk. On October 26, 1970, she was found bludgeoned to death in the trunk of her car. The damage to her skull was compared as to what would be seen in a fall from a building. The perpetrator also tore off a piece of her dress and tied it around her neck. Newkirk's purse, car keys, shoes, and underwear were stolen as well.

Other suspected murders 
Although the Miami Strangler was only conclusively linked to nine murders, he is also suspected of murdering Mary Francis Sims, a 31-year-old Miami housewife. Sims was found dead by her husband in their home in March of 1971. She was sexually assaulted, strangled, and stabbed in the throat on her bed.

The perpetrator may also be responsible for the murder of Clara Jane Armaly, who was strangled to death in her home on September 12, 1971. On the afternoon before her murder, Armaly was last seen alive by her estranged husband, who came to pick up their children for a visit. Armaly's body was found face down in her bedroom by her husband on the morning of September 13. There were no signs of forced entry into the house, nor were there any signs of a struggle between Armaly and the perpetrator.  Additionally, an electrical cord was found near her body, but it's unknown if the cord was used to strangle her. Armaly's husband went into a state of shock after finding her remains, and had to be sedated at the hospital. To date, no arrests have been made in Clara Armaly's murder.

Investigation 
Police linked the murders through their similarities. All but one of the victims were white, all of the crimes occurred in downtown Miami, all of the victims died from either strangulation, smothering, or bludgeoning, and all of the murders appear to have been sexually motivated. Investigators believed that the perpetrator was a sexual sadist with a fetish for attacking vulnerable women alone in their homes. However, the perpetrator's modus operandi was inconsistent, and he did not always exhibit the same behaviors in every murder.

Police questioned Calvin Jones Jr., a truck driver who had been recently released from prison following a conviction for his fourth felony. Jones was the parking lot attendant that changed Sylvia Valdez's tire and also knew Patrice Newkirk. However, Jones was never charged with any of the murders.

See also 
 Cold case
 Flat-Tire murders
 List of serial killers in the United States

References 

1970 murders in the United States
20th-century American criminals
American serial killers
Crimes in Florida
Deaths by strangulation in the United States
Unidentified serial killers
Unsolved murders in the United States
Violence against women in the United States